Veden varaan is a pop-rock album from the Finnish group PMMP. It was released in 2009 through Sony BMG.

Track listing
 Kuvia
 San Francisco
 Lautturi
 Viimeinen valitusvirsi
 Taajama
 Pariterapiaa
 Merimiehen vaimo
 Tulva
 Lapsuus loppui
 Se vaikenee joka pelkää

References

 http://www.last.fm/music/PMMP/Veden+varaan
 http://www.pmmp.fi/diskografia/veden-varaan/
 http://www.hs.fi/kulttuuri/levyt/artikkeli/PMMP+Veden+varaan/1135244433854

2009 albums
PMMP albums